Ogof Draenen (Welsh for "hawthorn cave") is, at 66 km (official figure; the true length of passage is still being revised upward, with a modern estimate of approximately 70 km), the longest cave system in Wales and the second longest in Great Britain behind the Three Counties System  on the Cumbria/Lancashire/Yorkshire border.

The cave was known only as a small entrance on a steep hillside until several years of digging broke through into major passage development in October 1994. It was then explored at unprecedented speed to become the longest known cave in Wales.

Ogof Draenen contains a variety of spectacular decorations and some huge passages (the War of the Worlds section is probably the second largest cave passage in Britain). Its large size and occasional complexity make the cave a challenge for even experienced cavers.

The cave is managed by the Pwll Du Cave Management Group.

References

Draenen
Landforms of Torfaen